The County of Clinton is a county (a cadastral division) in Queensland, Australia. It is centred on the city of Gladstone and includes most of the Gladstone Region. The county was created on 1 September 1855 by royal proclamation under the Waste Lands Australia Act 1846. On 7 March 1901, the Governor issued a proclamation legally dividing Queensland into counties under the Land Act 1897. Its schedule described Clinton thus:

Parishes 
Clinton is divided into parishes, as listed below:

References

External links 

 

Clinton